Thathi Thavadhu Manasu is a 2003 Indian Tamil-language drama film written and directed by Azhagu Rajasundaram. The film stars Sona, Urvasi Patel and Sindhuri, while Mumtaj, Vadivelu and Kalabhavan Mani also appear in supporting roles. The film was released on 19 December 2003.

Cast
Sona as Mahalakshmi
Urvasi Patel as Poonkodi
Sindhuri as Amudha
Mumtaj as police assistant commissioner, Aarthi
Abhinayashree
Kalabhavan Mani
Vadivelu as Inspector Vaigaivel
Nizhalgal Ravi
Subhashini
Fatima Babu
Kalidaas as IGP

Production
The film marked the directorial debut of Azhagu Rajasundaram, who had previously apprenticed under directors Pandiarajan and Vikraman for fifteen years. Produced by [V. K. Riaz Ahmed], the film's story was based around two real life incidents — the murder of a lawyer in bright daylight and the accident in which 40 individuals were killed.

Soundtrack

Release
The film had a low profile release on 19 December 2003. Film critic Balaji Balasubramaniam wrote "the movie's approach struggles between two completely opposite directions — a cheap, exploitative film and a tearjerker" and that "the producer seems to have banked on the film's glamour to bring in the viewers since that is what the title and the movie's promos focus on" and that "this is unfortunate because the main story has actually been taken quite well".

References

2003 films
2000s Tamil-language films
Indian drama films
Indian films based on actual events
Films scored by Deva (composer)
2003 directorial debut films
2003 drama films